Yami is a Hindu mother goddess or Tibetan death goddess

Yami may also refer to:

 Yami people, also known as the Tao
 Yami language
 Yami Yugi, a character from Yu-Gi-Oh!
 Yami Sukehiro, a character from Black Clover
 Dark Stranger Yami, a character from Time Stranger Kyoko
 Yami Volcano, a volcano in the Philippines
 Y'ami Island another name for Mavudis, an island in Batanes, in the Philippines
 Yami, the main villain and final boss in the video games Ōkami and Tatsunoko vs. Capcom: Ultimate All-Stars
 Golden Darkness, a nickname for the character in the To Love Ru manga series

Language and nationality disambiguation pages